Patrick Henderson (born 1937) is an Irish former footballer who played as a goalkeeper.

Football career
Henderson began his career at Holyhead Town in Wales before signing for League of Ireland side Shamrock Rovers  in 1961. He was key first team player and made two appearances in the European Champion Clubs' Cup while at Glenmalure Park against SK Rapid Wien. Henderson signed for Drogheda United, in 1965 before retiring with a back injury in 1967.

Family

Henderson has three sons involved in football. Eldest son, Dave was a goalkeeper who had two spells with the Hoops in the 1970s and 1990s, he is best known for his long term association with Bohemian F.C. The middle son, Stephen managed Cobh Ramblers F.C. to the Eircom First Division title and later Waterford United. Youngest son, Wayne, is a talented goalkeeper he has played for Aston Villa, Brighton and is currently contracted to Preston North End. Wayne has also represented then Republic of Ireland national football team at Senior level.

Honours
FAI Cup
  Shamrock Rovers - 1962
League of Ireland Shield
  Shamrock Rovers - 1962/63

Sources
 Paul Doolan and Robert Goggins, The Hoops,  Gill & Macmillan Ltd (October 1993); /

Republic of Ireland association footballers
Association football goalkeepers
Shamrock Rovers F.C. players
Drogheda United F.C. players
League of Ireland players
Association footballers from Dublin (city)
1938 births
Living people
Paddy